Lionel Walker Birch Martin (1878 – 21 October 1945) was an English businessman who co-founded the company that became Aston Martin.

Early life
He was born at Nansladron at Pentewan near St Austell in Cornwall, and was an only child. His father was Edward Martin (born in 1843), the owner of Martin Brothers China Clay Merchants in St Austell, who lived at Treverbyn, and who also owned the Lee Moor porcelain factory in Plympton. Martin Brothers, founded in 1837, became part of English China Clays.

His mother was Elizabeth Emily Birch (born in 1851 in Manchester), who had also been married previously to Walter Braithwaite who died, and she came from Salford, and her family were wealthy chalk and lime merchants; her father was William Singleton Birch, who had founded Singleton Birch, later run by his uncle Thomas Birch. His parents had married on 26 April 1877 at Lillington, Warwickshire; he was baptised on 20 May 1878 at Lillington church. He grew up in Knightsbridge. 

In 1891 he went to Eton College. In 1897 he went to Brasenose College, Oxford, where he was an enthusiast member of the Oxford University Bicycle Club, then joined the Bath Road Club. In 1900 he went to Marcon's Hall, also known as Charsley's Hall, run by Charles Abdy Marcon. He graduated with a BA in 1902.

Career
Through the Bath Road Club (BRC) he met Montague Napier, and in 1903 went into partnership with Napier to sell cars. 

In 1909 after not paying a fine, he was banned from driving for two years at Guildford. He appealed at the High Court  in January 1910, but the appeal was not upheld. For the next two years he rode bicycles, gaining the fastest record from Edinburgh to York in 1911.

Aston Martin

During his driving ban he had become friends with another cyclist in the Bath Road Club, Robert Bamford. In 1912 they began to sell cars together.  They co-founded Bamford and Martin Limited, at Henniker Mews in Kensington. Martin participated in competitions of the Motor Cycling Club, including those from London to Edinburgh. Their first advert was in the Bath Road News.

Their first prototype was registered in March 1915. To provide an evocative name for the car, the pair remembered their races at Aston Hill, and called the car the Aston-Martin; the AM radiator badge went onto their cars.

It was through the money from the Singleton Birch family minerals company Martin had the funds to expand his business.

In November 1925, Bamford and Martin Ltd went into receivership, and Martin was no longer a director of the company. At this time, Martin was working for Singleton Birch. After 1925,he never owned an Aston Martin car.

Personal life
In 1909, Martin  married Christine Murray (born 1888) of Auchendinny in Midlothian; Christine died in April 1913, shortly after the birth of their son (born 19 March 1913). Martin then married Katherine King (born 14 July 1888) on 25 January 1917 in Kensington. 

In the 1920s he lived in Pembroke Villas in Kensington. In his later years he was a diabetic.

Due to petrol rationing in the Second World War, he returned to travelling on his bicycle; on 14 October 1945 he was knocked off at a set of traffic lights on Gloucester Road near his home, dying aged 67 in Kingston County Hospital on 21 October 1945. He had lived from 1932 at Palings Cottage on Warboys Road at Kingston Hill, in the Municipal Borough of Malden and Coombe. His funeral was at 3pm on Monday 29 October 1945 at St. John the Baptist in Kingston Vale. He was buried at Putney Vale Cemetery.

References

1878 births
1945 deaths
Alumni of Brasenose College, Oxford
Alumni of Charsley's Hall, Oxford
Aston Martin
British male cyclists
British founders of automobile manufacturers
British racing drivers
Cycling road incident deaths
People educated at Eton College
People from Kensington
People from Kingston upon Thames
People from St Ewe
Road incident deaths in England